Trogoxylon parallelipipedum, the velvety powderpost beetle, is a species of powderpost beetle in the family Bostrichidae. It is found in Australia, Europe and Northern Asia (excluding China), and North America.

References

Further reading

External links

 

Bostrichidae
Articles created by Qbugbot
Beetles described in 1846